Carlotta Cambi (born 28 May 1996) is an Italian volleyball player for Igor Gorgonzola Novara and the Italian national team.

Career
Cambi was born at San Miniato.

She participated at the 2017 Women's European Volleyball Championship, and 2018 FIVB Volleyball Women's Nations League.

She was selected to play the Italian League All-Star game in 2017.

Awards

Clubs
 2015 Italian Supercup -  Champions, with Pomì Casalmaggiore
 2015–16 CEV Champions League -  Champions, with Pomì Casalmaggiore
 2016-17 Italian League —  Champions, with AGIL Novara

References

External links
 

1996 births
Living people
Sportspeople from the Province of Pisa
Italian women's volleyball players
Universiade medalists in volleyball
Universiade silver medalists for Italy
Medalists at the 2019 Summer Universiade